GOME may refer to:

 GOME Electrical Appliances.
 Global Ozone Monitoring Experiment an instrument on board the ERS-2 satellite.
 Global Ozone Monitoring Experiment-2 an instrument on the MetOp-A satellite.
 Guardians of Middle-earth, a video game.